Main Aurr Mrs Khanna is a 2009 Indian romance film starring Salman Khan, Kareena Kapoor and Sohail Khan in lead roles with  Nauheed Cyrusi, Yash Tonk and Bappi Lahiri in supporting roles while Preity Zinta and Deepika Padukone make brief special appearances. Directed by debutant Prem Soni, the film, which revolves around the theme of extramarital affair, is a joint production of Sohail Khan Productions and UTV Motion Pictures. The film is produced by Sohail Khan and Ronnie Screwvala, and was released during Diwali festival on 16 October 2009.

Plot
A young Indian couple Raina (Kareena Kapoor) and Samir (Salman Khan) meet and fall in love at first sight and decide to get married despite the objections from Samir's parents as Raina is an orphan. However, they begin their lives together move to Melbourne, where Samir works as a stockbroker. Raina decides to work in a restaurant to pass her time.

Their relationship develops problems when Samir's business takes a severe hit. In order to get his career back online, he decides to move to Singapore and start his work from scratch. He surprises her at the airport saying that they are not flying together. She is to go to Delhi and wait for him while he goes to gain success in Singapore, and that the relationship will be a failure without financial support.

Just after Samir catches the plane and leaves for Singapore, Raina has a chance meeting with Aakash (Sohail Khan) at the airport itself. They strike a rapport immediately, and once he knows of Raina's problems, Aakash lends a helping hand using his friend's (Mahek Chahal) help. He gets her a much better job at the airport. Now, Raina suddenly finds herself in the midst of a new and trendy airport job and in addition a good mansion to live in. Aakash falls deeply in love with Raina because they work together in close proximity, and Raina also seems to be attracted to him, or at least to depend on him for every small and big matter on a day-to-day basis. At this juncture, Raina is faced with the problem that her residency visa is going to expire and she will have to leave Australia. As usual, she takes her problem to Aakash. He and his friends suggest to her the idea of faking a marriage with Aakash so that she can stay on. Initially, Raina is reluctant, but soon she agrees after she realises that Aakash is a genuinely good-hearted man.

At this juncture, Samir reappears after having achieved success in Singapore. He finds that Raina is not all that thrilled at his surprise visit. He then stumbles upon the court papers concerning the wedding ceremony between Raina and Aakash and is shocked and appalled. However, Samir and Raina decide to give their relationship another chance. Aakash too agrees that Raina must try to resolve her differences with her husband. Later, Aakash finds love in a certain Mrs. Khan (Deepika Padukone), who coincidentally has the same name as Raina and once had a failed relationship with a person, whose name again coincidentally is Samir.

Cast
 Salman Khan as Samir Khanna 
 Kareena Kapoor as Raina Khanna
 Sohail Khan as Aakash Khanna
 Nauheed Cyrusi as Nina
 Yash Tonk as Harsh
 Mahek Chahal as Tia Roberts
 Deepika Padukone as Raina Khan (special appearance)
 Preity Zinta as Haseena Jagmagia (Special Appearance in song "Happening”)
 Dino Morea as Sanjay (special appearance)
 Bappi Lahiri as Victor Sir

Production
Pre-production work began in mid-2007 when actors Salman Khan and Priyanka Chopra were signed on to essay the lead roles in the film. However, Chopra later opted out of the film due to date problems and the director was in talks with actresses Preity Zinta and Ayesha Takia.

In August 2007, producer Sohail Khan announced that the film's title was changed to Mr and Mrs Khanna, and was expected to go on floors in November 2007 with Lara Dutta being signed on for the female lead. Unfortunately, Dutta was dropped from the film for unknown reasons and rumours had indicated that Khan was in talks with Kareena Kapoor and Deepika Padukone. The producer later confirmed the news to the media indicating that he had signed Kapoor for the film.

Sources had indicated that Shahrukh Khan, Priyanka Chopra and Deepika Padukone will be making guest appearances in the film whereas Preity Zinta will be appearing in an item number but nothing was confirmed as of March 2008. However, in June 2008, the latter confirmed the news to the media explaining, "...it's not an item song, really. It's an interesting cameo and I’ve agreed to be in the film because the director Prem Soni is a dear friend."

On 19 March 2008, the cast began filming for the project at Film City in the outskirts of Mumbai and later continued shooting in Melbourne, Australia, where a pivotal scene was shot at the Sydney Airport. Upon shooting in Melbourne Australia, the cast later returned to film in Mumbai on 15 June 2008. In March 2009, director Prem Soni announced that the film had been completed.

Box office 
The movie had a dismal performance at the box office. It did not open well, and moreover, the word of mouth publicity couldn't help since reactions across the board were negative. It eventually collecting only Rs. 66 million in its first week of domestic theatrical run, and there was hardly any second week collection because the film was taken down by theatre owners.Box office of the movie was highly affected due to clash with two other Diwali release 'Blue' and 'All The Best'.

However, according to the film-makers, the film was a success on the DTH/Satellite platform and had a reasonable viewership rating, with an estimated 210 million eyeballs. This claim cannot be independently verified. The satellite rights of the film had been sold three days before its release in theatres.

Soundtrack

The music had been composed by Sajid–Wajid.

References

External links
 
 
 

2009 films
2000s Hindi-language films
Films set in airports
Indian romantic comedy films
2009 romantic comedy films